Bobrovka is a rural locality (a selo) and the administrative center of Bobrovsky Selsoviet, Shipunovsky District, Altai Krai, Russia. The population was 850 as of 2013. There are 17 streets.

Geography 
Bobrovka is located 27 km north of Shipunovo (the district's administrative centre) by road. Beryozovka is the nearest rural locality.

References 

Rural localities in Shipunovsky District